Exodontha luteipes is a species of soldier fly in the family Stratiomyidae.

Distribution
Australia, Hawaiian Islands.

References

Stratiomyidae
Insects described in 1885
Taxa named by Samuel Wendell Williston
Diptera of Australasia